Vietnam women's national under-23 volleyball team represents Vietnam in women's under-23 volleyball events. It is controlled and managed by the Volleyball Federation of Vietnam (VFF) that is a member of Asian volleyball body Asian Volleyball Confederation (AVC) and the international volleyball body government the Fédération Internationale de Volleyball (FIVB).

Competition history

World Championship
  2013 — Did not enter
  2015 — Did not enter
  2017 — Did not qualify
 / 2019 — Qualified but cancelled due to Hong Kong protests

Asian Championship
  2015 — Did not enter
  2017 —  3rd Place
  2019 —  3rd Place

Asian Peace Cup
  2019 —  Gold medal

Current squad
Head coach:  Nguyễn Tuấn Kiệt
Assistant coaches:
 Lê Thị Hiền
 Nguyễn Trọng Linh

The following 12 players were called for the 2019 Asian Women's U23 Volleyball Championship.

Notes:
 OP Opposite Spiker
 OH Outside Hitter
 MB Middle Blocker
 S Setter
 L Libero

External links
Official website

volleyball
Women's volleyball in Vietnam
National women's under-23 volleyball teams